The Democratic Party of Artsakh (DPA, ԱԺԿ) is a political party in the Republic of Artsakh. It was founded on 30 January 2005. Before that, in 2000–2005 there was an acting socio-political organization called the "Democratic Artsakh Union". The Chairman of the party is Ashot Ghoulyan who is also the President of the National Assembly. Following the results of the parliamentary elections of 19 June 2005, DPA won the most electoral votes and formed the "Democracy" faction in the National Assembly. As a result of the elections to the National Assembly of the 5th convocation, the faction was reformed with 10 members. After the Parliamentary elections of 3 May 2015, Democratic Party of Artsakh reformed its faction with 6 members (4 MPs were elected by a proportional system, 2 MPs by a majoritarian system).

Ideology 
According to its website, the DPA stands for the values of stability, establishing a powerful state, improving democracy, civil society, human rights and personal freedom and protection, family, work, and social justice, as well as the preservation of the national culture. Political pragmatism is practised whenever possible.

Program 
The main goals of the DPA are:
 to build a legal state where the rights of a person to live a free, safe, prosperous and dignified life are ensured;
 to strengthen of independent statehood, creation of a powerful, civilized state, enrichment and preservation of national identity;
 to build a civil society guided by national values, based on social solidarity, justice, tolerance and partnerships

In regards to the settlement of the Nagorno-Karabakh conflict, the party states in its charter that it supports "the reinstatement of the right of the people of the NKR to self-determination through the peaceful negotiations within the borders and with a security system acceptable to them."

Electoral record 
Parliamentary election results:

Foreign relations 
On 17 April 2015, the Democratic Party of Artsakh was elected as an associate member of the European Free Alliance. On 2 September 2015, the DPA leader Ashot Ghoulyan and European Free Alliance president François Alfonsi signed a Declaration on Cooperation in Stepanakert.

See also

 List of political parties in Artsakh

References

External links
Democratic Party of Artsakh on Facebook

Political parties in the Republic of Artsakh
 
Conservative parties
Right-wing parties